Border Communities Against Brexit (BCAB) is an organisation which seeks to protect people who live close to the border between the Republic of Ireland and Northern Ireland from the claimed negative consequences of Brexit. The organisation is active in both Northern Ireland and the Republic of Ireland.

In July 2017 the European Parliament awarded the group a European Citizen's Prize.

Protests

On 8 October 2016 six protests took place along the border. One protest took place at Carrickcarnon, Dundalk where a mock customs checkpoint was set up. About 150 protesters gathered at the border between Belcoo in Co Fermanagh and Blacklion in Co Cavan. There were also protests at Moybridge between Tyrone and Monaghan, Aghalane between Fermanagh and Cavan and Lifford Bridge between Tyrone and Donegal.

In late March 2017 the organisation marched on Stormont. The protest included about 300 people, including SDLP leader Colum Eastwood and Sinn Féin leader in the North, Michelle O'Neill.

In September 2019, leaders of the organization met with the French ambassador to Ireland Stephane Crouzat. In January 2020, the organisation organized a protest alongside the Irish border.

See also
Euroscepticism in Ireland
Irish border question

References

Brexit–related advocacy groups in the United Kingdom
Republic of Ireland–United Kingdom border
Political advocacy groups in Northern Ireland
Political advocacy groups in the Republic of Ireland